Jalalabad (also Romanized as Jalālābād) is a village in Deh Fish Rural District, Banaruiyeh District, Larestan County, Fars Province, Iran. At the 2006 census, its population was 137, in 25 families.

References 

Populated places in Larestan County